Taewonsu is the highest possible military rank of North Korea and is intended to be an honorific title for Kim Il-sung and Kim Jong-il. It is often confused with Marshal of the Republic and Marshal of the Korean People's Army, but ranks above both. The rank is senior to that of Wonsu. The title also exists in Chinese military history as dàyuánshuài (same Sino-Korean characters ), and was briefly taken by Sun Yat-sen.

History

The rank of taewonsu was created by a joint decision of the Central Committee and Central Military Commission of the Workers' Party of Korea, the National Defence Commission and the Central People's Committee in April 1992 to honor Kim Il-sung on his 80th birthday (Day of the Sun). In February 2012, his son and successor Kim Jong-il was awarded the title posthumously on the occasion of his official 70th birthday (Day of the Shining Star).

The insignia for taewonsu is similar to wonsu but with an added crest worn beneath the shoulder board's large marshal star (and an added crest added to the parade uniform's marshal star worn below the collar), below the Emblem of North Korea. The rank insignia is based on the unofficial rank Generalissimus of the Soviet Union.

Kim Jong-Un has been seen wearing the rank of taewonsu in public appearance with the military, and parades in 2022.

Rank comparison

According to rank comparison charts of the United States Forces Korea (USFK), taewonsu is equivalent to a "seven-star general", with the junior ranks of wonsu and chasu listed as six and five stars respectively.

The South Korean armed forces have never made an attempt to declare an equivalent to the wonsu ranks of North Korea, and indeed often deride these ranks as having been created so as to "outrank" the military leaders of other nations, rather than for any necessary purpose of military administration.  Even so, the holders of these ranks have commanded one of the largest military forces in the Pan-Asian theater therefore giving some credence to their existence.

See also
Other pronunciations of the characters 
 Da Yuan Shuai in Chinese
 Dai-Gensui, the Japanese equivalent

, a rank lower than Taewonsu
 Wonsu in Korean 
 Yuan Shuai, the original Chinese title
 Gensui, the Japanese equivalent

Notes

References

External links
 Image of Kim Il-sung in the taewŏnsu uniform
 Image of Kim Il-sung in the taewŏnsu uniform
 Image of Kim Jong-il wonsu and Kim Il-sung taewŏnsu shoulder/collar insignia and crests

Military ranks of North Korea
1992 establishments in North Korea